Lucilla de Arcangelis is an Italian statistical physicist known for her work on percolation theory, self-organized criticality, power laws in fracture, and applications including earthquake prediction and neuroscience. She is a professor of physics at the Università degli Studi della Campania Luigi Vanvitelli (the University of Campania or Second University of Naples).

Education and career
De Arcangelis earned a laurea from the University of Naples Federico II in 1980. She completed her Ph.D. at Boston University in 1986; her dissertation, Multifractality in Percolation: the Voltage Distribution, was supervised by Sidney Redner.

After postdoctoral or visiting research positions at the University of Cologne, Saclay Nuclear Research Centre, and Forschungszentrum Jülich, she became a researcher for the French National Centre for Scientific Research, working in the Laboratoire Physique et Mécanique des Milieux Hétérogènes at ESPCI Paris, in 1990. She took an associate professorship at the University of L'Aquila in 1993, and moved to the University of Campania in 1996, becoming full professor of the theoretical physics of condensed matter in the Department of Industrial and Information Engineering in 2014.

Recognition
In 2020, de Arcangelis was named a Fellow of the American Physical Society (APS), after a nomination from the APS Division of Computational Physics, for "the discovery of new principles underlying the strong temporal correlations in avalanching critical systems, including fracture of disordered heterogeneous materials, solar flares, earthquakes, and dynamic balance between excitation and inhibition in the brain". Since 2021 she is Chair of the C3 Statistical Physics Commission of IUPAP.

References

External links
Home page

Year of birth missing (living people)
Living people
21st-century Italian physicists
Italian women physicists
University of Naples Federico II alumni
Boston University alumni
Fellows of the American Physical Society
Academic staff of the Università degli Studi della Campania Luigi Vanvitelli